Technologist was a European popular science magazine published by Eurotech Universities beginning in June 2014. It was produced by the Swiss media agency LargeNetwork and published in English, French and German. It was based in Geneva and sold in twenty countries.  When accessed on 11 December, 2019, its website referred to itself in the past tense. The archives remain available online, with 17 from early in 2019 and many dozens more from 2014 through 2018.

See also
 List of magazines in Switzerland

References

External links
 Official website
 Eurotech Universities

2014 establishments in Switzerland
2019 disestablishments in Switzerland
Defunct magazines published in Switzerland
École Polytechnique
English-language magazines
French-language magazines
German-language magazines
Magazines established in 2014
Magazines disestablished in 2019
Magazines published in Geneva
Multilingual magazines
Popular science magazines
Quarterly magazines
Technical University of Munich